Vellalakundam is a village in the Vazhapadi taluk of Salem district, in Tamil Nadu, India.

Geography
Vellalakundam is within Vazhapadi taluk, which is in the central part of Salem district. It is to the north of a reserved forest that is between the town and Tirumanur. Vellalakundam is within the drainage basin of the Vellar River, and the Singipuram River, a tributary of the Vellar, flows through the town during the wet season.

Demographics
In 2011 Vellalakundam had a population of 6,904 people living in 1,843 households. 3,470 (50.3%) of the inhabitants were male, while 3,434 (49.7%) were female. 695 children in the town, about 10% of the population, were at or below the age of 6. The literacy rate in the town was 64.9%%. Scheduled Castes and Scheduled Tribes accounted for 24% and 0.3% of the population, respectively.

References

Villages in Salem district
Villages in Vazhapadi taluk